Midstream is a business category in the petroleum industry.

Midstream may also refer to:

Midstream (album), a 1978 album by Debbie Boone
Midstream (film), a 1929 American film directed by James Flood
Midstream (magazine), a Zionist magazine
Mid-stream operation, the loading and unloading cargo containers at a container ship while at sea